Olive Eleanor Boardman (August 19, 1898 – December 12, 1991) was an American film actress of the silent era.

Early life and career
Olive Eleanor Boardman was born on August 19, 1898, the youngest child to George W. Boardman and Janice Merriam "Jennie" Stockman Boardman. She had two older sisters named Merriam and Esther. In 1920, she was working as a contractor.

Educated in Philadelphia, Boardman originally acted on stage, but she lost her voice while starring in The National Anthem. She then entered a nationwide contest for new actors and actresses for silent films. She was chosen from among 1,000 competitors by Goldwyn Pictures as their "New Face of 1922". Her initial screen test was unsuccessful, but a second test resulted in a contract.  After several successful supporting roles, she played the lead in Souls for Sale in 1923. That same year, Boardman's growing popularity was reflected by her inclusion on the list of WAMPAS Baby Stars.

She appeared in more than 30 films during her career, achieving her greatest success in director King Vidor's The Crowd (1928). Her performance in that film is widely recognized as one of the outstanding performances in American silent film. In 1932, after some success in sound films, she parted ways with MGM. Her final film was The Three Cornered Hat, which was made in Spain in 1935. After that production, she retired from acting and retreated from Hollywood. Her only subsequent appearance was in an interview filmed for Kevin Brownlow and David Gill's British documentary series Hollywood (1980).

Personal life
Boardman was married to film director King Vidor, with whom she had two daughters, Antonia and Belinda. They married in 1926 and were divorced on April 11, 1933. Fellow actors John Gilbert and Greta Garbo had allegedly planned a double wedding with them, but Garbo broke the plans at the last minute.

On May 23, 1929, a federal grand jury returned an indictment that charged Boardman with evading income tax payments in 1925, 1926, and 1927. Simultaneously, an information filed in federal court accused Vidor of income tax evasion in 1925 and 1926. J. Marjorie Berger, an income tax counselor in Hollywood, had earlier been indicted on charges of preparing a false income tax return for the couple for 1925.

Boardman's second husband was Harry d'Abbadie d'Arrast, to whom she was married from 1940. She divided her time between the United States and their chateau in the Pyrenees Mountains. After her husband's death in 1968, she permanently relocated back to the United States, where she settled into Montecito, California, living in a house she designed.

Death
Boardman died in her sleep at her Santa Barbara, California, home on December 12, 1991, at the age of 93. Her ashes were scattered in Santa Barbara near her home.

Recognition 
For her contributions to the film industry, Boardman has a motion pictures star on the Hollywood Walk of Fame. Her star is located at 6928 Hollywood Boulevard.

Filmography

References

External links

Eleanor Boardman photo gallery
Photographs and literature
Publicity still, Le Petit Journal (Montreal, Canada, weekly newspaper), 26 May 1926

1898 births
1991 deaths
American film actresses
American silent film actresses
Actresses from Philadelphia
20th-century American actresses
WAMPAS Baby Stars